The M Countdown Chart is a record chart on the South Korean Mnet television music program M Countdown. Every week, the show awards the best-performing single on the chart in the country during its live broadcast.

In 2017, 31 singles ranked number one on the chart and 23 music acts were awarded first-place trophies. Four songs collected trophies for three weeks and achieved a triple crown: "Fxxk It" by Big Bang, "Yes I Am" by Mamamoo, "Ko Ko Bop" by Exo, and "Energetic" by Wanna One. Of all releases for the year, only two songs earned a perfect score of 11,000 points: "Power" by Exo and "DNA" by BTS.

Scoring system 
Songs were judged based on a combination of digital music sales (50%), album sales (15%), social media performance (official YouTube music video views and SNS buzz: 15%), popularity (global fan votes and age range preference) (10%), Mnet's broadcast score (10%), and SMS voting (10%).

Chart history

References 

2017 in South Korean music
2017 record charts
Lists of number-one songs in South Korea